The Punta Sardina Lighthouse is an active lighthouse on the Canary island of Gran Canaria. It is located north of the small town of Sardina, in the municipality of Gáldar. The Punta Sardina light marks the north-western extremity of the island, and lies between the Punta del Castillete lighthouse near Puerto de Mogán to the south and the La Isleta lighthouse of Las Palmas to the east.

History 
The lighthouse is the second to be constructed on the rocky headland of Punta Sardina (Sardine Point), which overlooks the Atlantic Ocean. The first was completed in 1891, as part of the first maritime lighting plan for the Canaries. It remained in service until it was demolished in the 1980s to make way for the new modern tower.

It supports twin galleries and a lantern with a grey cupola. Its light characteristic is made up of four flashes of white light every twenty seconds.

The lighthouse is maintained by the Port authority of the Province of Las Palmas. It is registered under the international Admiralty number D2816 and has the NGA identifier of 113-23928.

See also 

 List of lighthouses in Spain
 List of lighthouses in the Canary Islands

References

External links 

 Comisión de faros
 Autoridad Portuaria de Las Palmas de Gran Canaria

Lighthouses completed in 1985
Lighthouses in Gran Canaria